Daniel Patrick Wozniak (born March 23, 1984) is a former American community theatre actor who was convicted of two counts of murder in September 2016. In May 2010, Wozniak killed his neighbor and friend, Private First Class Samuel Eliezer "Sam" Herr, and Herr's friend, Juri "Julie" Kibuishi, as part of a plan to frame Herr for Kibuishi's murder and steal his combat pay. Wozniak was deeply in debt and wanted money to finance his upcoming wedding and honeymoon. Wozniak and his then-fiancée, Rachel Mae Buffett, lived in the same apartment complex as Herr in Costa Mesa, California.

After more than five years of court proceedings, Wozniak went to trial and was convicted on two counts of first-degree murder. He was found guilty and sentenced to death in September 2016. He was incarcerated at California's San Quentin State Prison until July 2021, when he was moved to Salinas Valley State Prison as part of the Condemned Inmate Transfer Pilot Program.

Crimes and cover-up
On May 21, 2010, Wozniak shot and killed his neighbor, Private First Class Samuel "Sam" Herr, a 26-year-old Afghanistan War veteran, at a Los Alamitos theater. At the time of the murders, Wozniak was deeply in debt and unemployed but planning a lavish wedding and honeymoon. After Herr told him that he had savings of about $62,000 from combat pay, Wozniak decided to kill him in order to acquire
the money. 

In an effort to misdirect police and cast blame upon Herr, Wozniak then used Herr's cell phone to text Juri "Julie" Kibuishi, a 23-year-old college student who had been tutoring Herr at Orange Coast College. Wozniak lured Kibuishi to Herr's apartment, where he shot and killed her. Wozniak then staged the crime scene to make it appear as though Kibuishi had been sexually assaulted, suggesting that Herr had committed her assault and subsequent murder and then gone on the run. The same evening, Wozniak went on to perform in his local theatre production of the musical Nine. Afterwards, Wozniak dismembered Herr’s body by removing his limbs and head.

An extensive manhunt for Herr was launched by authorities who at that point still believed Herr was responsible for Kibuishi's murder and was on the run. Wozniak came under suspicion after he instructed a sixteen-year-old, Wesley Freilich, to withdraw money from Herr's accounts. When the police confronted the boy, they were told by the boy that Wozniak had asked him to withdraw the money for him. 

Soon after, Wozniak was apprehended by US Marshals while at his bachelor party two days before his wedding.

After repeatedly lying to police, Wozniak finally confessed. Wozniak led authorities to the area where almost all of Herr's dismembered body was found discarded at El Dorado Nature Center in Long Beach. After more than five years of court proceedings, Wozniak went to trial and was convicted on two counts of first-degree murder. He was sentenced to death in September 2016 before California Governor Gavin Newsom declared a moratorium on capital punishment in the state.

In November 2012, Wozniak's then-fiancée, Rachel Mae Buffett, was arrested and charged with three felony counts of accessory-after-the-fact based on allegations that she had lied multiple times to police investigators. 

On September 12, 2018, Buffett was convicted on two of those counts with a maximum possible sentence of 44 months and, on November 8, 2018, was sentenced to 32 months minus time served and good behavior. She was released from jail sometime in 2019.

In popular culture
The case has been covered by numerous crime and news programs in the United States, including:

 Dr. Phil ("Actress Accused: Was She an Accessory to Murder?", first aired February 5, 2013). During the show, Samuel's father, Steve Herr, showed resentment toward Rachel Buffett, Wozniak's then-fiancée, and her claims of not knowing anything about the murders. Buffett was convicted in 2018 as an accessory-after-the-fact in the murders. She was sentenced to 32 months in prison, minus time served and good behavior. She was released in 2019.
 Lockup (MSNBC, "Lockup Orange County: Extended Stay: Unholy Trinity"). The episode was filmed in the Orange County Jail and featured an interview with Wozniak as he proclaimed his innocence. The episode outraged the relatives of Wozniak's victims, who said he charmed the camera and proclaimed his devotion to the Bible and the two people he killed.
 Dateline NBC ("Plot Twist", first aired January 15, 2016; "Final Curtain," first aired November 30, 2018; "Plot Twist" repackaged and shown on Dateline: Secrets Uncovered, a part of Oxygen, aired July 5, 2019). Buffett was interviewed by reporter Josh Mankiewicz about her part in the murder investigation.
 20/20 (ABC, "Mystery in Apartment 410" first aired March 4, 2016). Reported on the May 2010 murders.
 Crime Watch Daily (first aired June 8, 2016): Profiled the case.
 The Perfect Murder (Investigation Discovery, "Curtain Call," first aired August 24, 2016). Reported on the case.
 CBS' 48 Hours ("Killer Performance," first aired October 9, 2016). Correspondent Tracy Smith interviewed friends and family members of the victims, as well as the case prosecutor and other public officials.
 Unusual Suspects: Deadly Intent (Investigation Discovery, "Final Curtain," first aired November 1, 2017). Reported on the case and depicted Wozniak as an unassuming killer.
 My Favorite Murder ("Live at The Grove in Anaheim," first aired November 2, 2017). Karen Kilgariff tells the story of "killer Daniel Wozniak."
 In Ice Cold Blood (Oxygen, "Closing Night"). Profile of the case.
 20/20 (ABC, "The Final Act" first aired May 31, 2019).
 Crime Junkie ("MURDERED: Julie Kibuishi and Sam Herr")

Additional pop culture references:
The song "Killer," from Eminem's 2020 album Music to Be Murdered By – Side B (Deluxe Edition), references Wozniak.

See also
 List of homicides in California
 Capital punishment in California
 List of death row inmates in the United States

References

External links
Military Justice for All - Sam Herr

Living people
Place of birth missing (living people)
1984 births
2010 in California
Criminals from California
Crime in California
Murder in California
Deaths by firearm in California
People convicted of murder by California
Prisoners sentenced to death by California
Murder trials
American people convicted of murder
American prisoners sentenced to death
21st-century American criminals